A triforium is an interior gallery, opening onto the tall central space of a building at an upper level. In a church, it opens onto the nave from above the side aisles; it may occur at the level of the clerestory windows, or it may be located as a separate level below the clerestory. Masonry triforia are generally vaulted and separated from the central space by arcades. Early triforia were often wide and spacious, but later ones tend to be shallow, within the thickness of an inner wall, and may be blind arcades not wide enough to walk along. The outer wall of the triforium may itself have windows (glazed or unglazed openings), or it may be solid stone. A narrow triforium may also be called a "blind-storey", and looks like a row of window frames.

History
Triforium is derived from the Latin tres, tria "three", and foris, "door, entrance"; its Greek equivalent is τρίθυρον, which originally referred to a building with three doors.
 
The earliest examples of triforia are those in the pagan basilicas, where a triforium constituted an upper gallery for conversation and business; in the early Christian basilicas such a passageway was usually reserved for women, and the same applied to those in the Eastern Orthodox Church.

In Romanesque and Gothic buildings it is either a spacious gallery over the side aisles or is reduced to a simple passage in the thickness of the walls; in either case it forms an important architectural division in the nave of the cathedral or church, and being of less height gives more importance to the ground storey or nave arcade. In consequence of its lesser height its bay was usually divided into two arches, which were again subdivided into two smaller arches and these subdivisions increased the apparent scale of the aisle below and the clerestory above.

On account of the richness of its mouldings and carved ornament in the sculpture introduced in the spandrels, it became the most highly decorated feature of the interior. The triforium at Lincoln has been described as one of the most beautiful compositions of English Gothic architecture. Even when reduced to a simple passage it was always a highly enriched feature. In the 15th-century churches in England, when the roof over the aisles was comparatively flat, more height being required for the clerestory windows, the triforium was dispensed with altogether. In the great cathedrals and abbeys the triforium was often occupied by persons who came to witness various ceremonies, and in early days was probably used by the monks and clergy for work connected with the church.

The triforium sometimes served structural functions, as under its roof are arches and vaults which carry thrust from the nave to the outer wall. When the flying buttress was frankly adopted by the Gothic architect and emphasized by its architectural design as an important feature, other cross-arches were introduced under the roof to strengthen it.

Matroneum

This definition is disputed by Valerio Ascani, professor of the history of medieval art at the University of Pisa: according to Ascani, matronea were in fact intended for all persons who could not, or did not want to, enter the main body of the church below, including men as well as women, although the sexes were always separated to left and right.

In medieval churches, matronea lost their function of accommodation and became purely architectonic elements, placed over the side aisles with the structural purpose of containing the thrust of the central nave, and came to consist solely of bays so placed.

In Early Gothic churches, the matronea were one of the four elements which constituted the interior walls (arch, matroneum, triforium and clerestory), but they grew rare in the succeeding period of full-blown Gothic architecture.

Gallery

See also
Cathedral architecture of the Western World

References

External links

Pitt.edu: Triforium
Vitruvius, a Roman architect, on how to design a basilica

Architectural elements
Church architecture
Mosque architecture